Michail Elgin and Alexander Kudryavtsev were the defending champions but decided not to participate.
John Paul Fruttero and Raven Klaasen won the final 6–2, 6–4 against Colin Ebelthite and Samuel Groth.

Seeds

Draw

Draw

References
 Main Draw

Green World ATP Challenger - Doubles
2012 Doubles
2012 in Chinese tennis